is a free-to-play tower defense video game developed and published by PONOS Corporation for iOS and Android, which was originally released in Japan under the name にゃんこ大戦争 (Nyanko Great War). The Battle Cats debuted on the Japanese iOS App Store in November 2012 under the name of Battle Nekos, with Android support following in December of that same year. It received immense popularity in Japan and Korea. It later was deleted in both the US Google Play stores and App Store, with an improved version of the game released on September 17, 2014. A Microsoft Windows port release was released in August 2017, and was available for download until late 2018, when PONOS Corporation cut support for it. It was ported to the Nintendo 3DS in 2016 and Nintendo Switch in Japan in 2018 and Southeast Asia in 2021.

Plot 
The plot in the game is taught through screens of scrolling text, usually appearing at the beginning and end of each "Chapter".

Empire of Cats 
The story of Empire of Cats (commonly shortened to EoC) consists of an army of "Battle Cats" appearing amidst the world's varying crises. The identity of the creator of these Battle Cats is the fictional deity The Cat God, which can be unlocked as a power up early into the story, and beating chapter two of Cats Of The Cosmos unlocks it as a unit. The cats then proceed to take over the world, to harness the world's power.

Into the Future
The second main story chapter of the game, Into the Future (shortened to ItF)'s story revolves around a time machine the cats obtained in the beginning of Stories of Legend. Using this, they travelled to the future, and find that Aliens have taken over Earth. Battles for the world then commence between the 2 forces.

Cats of the Cosmos
The final main chapter of the game, Cats of the Cosmos (often shortened to CotC) begins when interplanetary travel becomes possible. Utilizing this technology, the cats begin to invade outer space, attacking a variety of places in the Cosmos.

Gameplay 

The Battle Cats is a tower defense game where the player selects a team of unlockable "cats", or units, to defeat enemies in order to protect their base (called "Cat Base"). Gameplay involves sending the roster of the cats onto a 2D battlefield to defend the Cat Base and defeat the enemy's corresponding base. Enemies have traits such as "Red", "Floating", or "Aku".

In battle, each cat and enemy unit has different stats and sometimes abilities, which allow them to be more effective against the opposite type. For example, the cat "Axe Cat" is strong against the "Red" enemy type, which allows any spawned copies of the cat to deal more and take less damage against "Red". To win the battle, a player must employ different types of cats, such as those that can outrange enemies, meat shields, or crowd controllers.

The Battle Cats contains 3 main stories: Empire of Cats (EoC), Into the Future (ItF) and Cats of the Cosmos (CotC), with each story containing 3 chapters. There are also two extra chapters: The Legend Stages and the Catclaw Dojo. The Legend Stages contain multiple sub-chapters,  The Catclaw Dojo contains a stage to test how many enemies you can defeat within a given period of time, with an addition of some collaborated stages of the same premise, except with collaborated enemies.

The Legend Stages are further divided into two categories: Stories of Legend (SoL) and Uncanny Legends (UL), with the latter being unlocked after completing the former. There is also an additional category for event and Collaboration stages.

The cats are the protagonists that the player deploys throughout the game. Many cats may not look like or be a typical cat (and are sometimes equipped with external objects such as weapons or machines) or are characters earned in collaboration with other games. Cats have level caps, or maximum levels, which differ across cat units. All cats have a maximum level of 50, or rarely 40. Double-ups obtained in Gacha can be used to add additional "plus levels" to a cat unit. The cats are divided into six rarities, in increasing rarity: Basic, Special, Rare, Super Rare, Uber Super Rare (commonly shortened to Uber Rare or just Uber), and Legend Rare.

Gacha system 
Cat Capsule, often referred to as gacha, is an area where the player can spend Cat Tickets, Rare Cat Tickets, Lucky Tickets and Cat Food to obtain Cat Units and Ability Capsules. The rewards earned are then either immediately used, immediately exchanged for XP/NP, saved in the Cat Storage to be used later, or exchanged to get a Rare Ticket.

Console ports

The Battle Cats POP! 

The Battle Cats POP! (often abbreviated to BCP) was released for the Nintendo 3DS worldwide on June 27, 2016. The game featured mechanics similar to The Battle Cats, but also introduced a 2 player VS mode and made use of the 3DS 3D capabilities.

Reception 
The Battle Cats POP! received average reviews. CJ Andriessen of Destructoid gave the game a 7 out of 10 and wrote that "The Battle Cats POP! is a game that's as fun as it is weird. When it's not putting you in time out with the energy meter, it can be addictive like Pokémon. Too much of its free-to-play roots are still present, but even with these elements, it's still a worthwhile time killer." Matt S. of Digitally Downloaded gave 3.5 stars out of 5 and noted "what sets Battle Cats apart from the many similar games of similar depth and strategy is that hugely creative edge. This game is the distinctive and memorable example of the genre, because the artists had the sense to do something that makes no sense, but we end up looking forward to each new level just to see the insanity that it brings." However, the stamina system was criticized by reviewers, as Louisa Bhairam with Nintendo Life stated "It's a bit of an odd system for a game which requires no micro-transactions, [...] It's a feature which should have been removed entirely for the 3DS version.

The Battle Cats Unite! 
The Battle Cats Unite! was released for the Nintendo Switch by Bandai Namco Entertainment in Japan and Southeast Asia on December 9, 2021. The game is a revamped port of The Battle Cats, with a new 2-player co-op mode and four different minigames being exclusive to this version.

Spinoffs

Battle Cats Rangers 
Battle Cats Rangers, an idle/clicker game published by MEMORY Inc and developed with YD Online Corp, was released for Android and iOS devices on April 27, 2017. In Battle Cats Rangers, players tap the screen as quick as possible to attack incoming enemies and bosses that swarm their team of cats. 2 weeks prior to the release, a pre-registration campaign was announced which encouraged users to sign up for in-game currency.  By using coins and cat food, the in-game currency, players can level up their cats to deal more damage and progress through the game. Overtime, players can add more cats to their team and encounter stronger enemies they have to defeat. After 2 years, the game shut down its online servers and the game was no longer playable after March 29, 2019.

Go! Go! Pogo Cat 
5 years after the release of The Battle Cats, PONOS Corp released Go! Go! Pogo Cat, a simple infinite platformer similar to Flappy Bird. The player directs a cat riding a pogo stick to gain as much distance as possible, collecting items like gems. For players that have The Battle Cats downloaded, they can complete certain missions in-game for rewards redeemable in The Battle Cats.

Battle Cats Quest 
On November 14, 2021, PONOS Corp released Battle Cats Quest. In this game, players roll a spherical cat on land to knock off enemies from various stages and earn coins. Similarly to Go! Go! Pogo Cat, players can complete in-game missions for rewards redeemable in The Battle Cats.

Notes

References

External links 
The Battle Cats (Android)  (iOS)   
PONOS website

2014 video games
IOS games
Free-to-play video games
Mobile games
Indie video games
Strategy video games
Android (operating system) games
Tower defense video games
Nintendo 3DS games
Puzzle video games
Video games developed in Japan